Tilagaon Union is a Union Parishad under Kulaura Upazila of Moulvibazar District in the division of Sylhet, Bangladesh. It has an area of 18 square kilometres and a population of 31868.

References

Unions of Kulaura Upazila